Gerald H. Allen (born February 8, 1950) is a Republican lawmaker in the Alabama Senate. He previously served in the Alabama House of Representatives.

Early life
George H. Allen was born on February 8, 1950, in Tuscaloosa, Alabama.

Career
Allen was first elected to the Alabama House in 1994. In 2005, Allen proposed Alabama House Bill 30 (HB30), which would have banned public school libraries from purchasing books by gay authors or with gay characters. The bill did not become law.

Allen defeated incumbent Phil Poole, a Democrat, in the 2010 elections to the Alabama Senate. In 2011, Allen proposed a bill to ban Sharia law. He sponsored a 2014 amendment to the Alabama Constitution banning "foreign law".

In 2017, Allen sponsored a bill for the Alabama Memorial Preservation Act to make it harder to remove Confederate monuments in Alabama.

In May 2019, he voted to make abortion a crime at any stage in a pregnancy, with no exemptions for cases of rape or incest.

Personal life
Allen is the father of incumbent Secretary of State of Alabama and former state representative Wes Allen. Both made history for being the first father and son to serve at the same time in the Alabama legislature when Wes Allen was elected to the House in 2018.

References

External links
 

Living people
Republican Party members of the Alabama House of Representatives
Republican Party Alabama state senators
1950 births
Politicians from Tuscaloosa, Alabama
21st-century American politicians